Jason Christophe White is an NAACP Theater Award-winning American playwright, his one produced play being The Dance: The History of American Minstrelsy, which he co-wrote and co-directed with Aaron White (no relation). Jason White is also the co-owner of In Tha Cut Productions.

He is a graduate of The California Institute of the Arts, where he received a BFA in Acting in 2004.

Books
The Autobiography of The Dance (2004)

Plays
The Dance: The History of American Minstrelsy (2005) (Co-Director)

Awards
In 2007, White shared an NAACP award for “Best Playwright” with Aaron White for The Dance: The History of American Minstrelsy. The production has garnered the support of Harry Belafonte, KCET and others.

References

External links
Variety.com - The Dance: The History of American Minstrelsy
The Dance: The History of American Minstrelsy | YouTube

African-American dramatists and playwrights
African-American screenwriters
American dramatists and playwrights
American male screenwriters
Living people
American male dramatists and playwrights
Year of birth missing (living people)
21st-century African-American people
African-American male writers